Breadsmith is a Milwaukee, Wisconsin-based bakery franchise organization that specializes in artisan breads, and has over 35 stores in the United States, mostly located in the Upper Midwest.

History
Founder Dan Sterling opened his first bakery in Milwaukee, Wisconsin in 1993. While studying abroad in Norway, Dan got his first taste of European breads. When he returned to the United States, he graduated from Harvard Business School and volunteered to help a local bakery with its accounting. Dan never lost his love of European homemade breads, and from there came the idea to launch a bakery of his own, which today is called Breadsmith.
In 1993, Dan opened the doors to his first Bakery located in Milwaukee, Wisconsin at 2632 N. Downer Ave, where a Breadsmith owned by franchisee Don Kaminski is still open today. One year later, in 1994, Dan sold his first franchised store and the company has continued to grow as a franchise operation. 
Currently there are 35 Breadsmith stores around the United States. Dan Sterling ran Breadsmith, Inc until 2001, when he decided to begin several new successful business adventures.

Breadsmith's current President is Tim Malouf, he has been in position since February 2006. Tim began his career at Breadsmith shortly after the first store opening in 1993. He has worked in several positions including head of research and development and vice president before being promoted to president. The current Breadsmith Franchising, Inc office is located at 409 E Silver Spring Drive, Whitefish Bay, WI.

Breads
Breadsmith sells a variety of products, but is focused on breads (including French Boule, French Baguette, French Peasant, Sourdough, Rustic Italian and Whole Wheat) which make up the company's daily bread offerings. Breadsmith offers artisan breads without additives or preservatives, and makes specialty breads, cookies, muffins and sweets. Breadsmith also offers specialty breads including  Brioche, Ciabatta, Cornbread, Focaccia, Multigrain, Pizza Dough, Raisin Cinnamon, Russian Rye, Stollen, Traditional Rye, and a variety of dessert breads, cookies, scones and coffee cakes.

Operations
Breadsmith is focused on "made-from-scratch, hand-crafted" breads using ingredients including unbleached, unbromated wheat flour.  Each store has a 6-ton stone hearth oven that can bake up to 160 loaves at one time, and the oven's steam injection system gives the breads their distinctive European-style crust. Breadsmith stores can be found in 35 locations in 14 states including Arizona, Illinois, Indiana, Maryland, Michigan, Minnesota, Mississippi, Missouri, New York, New Jersey, North Dakota, South Dakota, Ohio, South Carolina, Texas, and Wisconsin. Most stores provide loaves to retail shoppers, as well as restaurants and grocers via wholesale partnerships.

References

Bakeries of the United States
Restaurant franchises
Companies based in Milwaukee
Food manufacturers of the United States
Privately held companies based in Wisconsin
Food and drink companies established in 1993
Bakery cafés